The government of Canada is the body responsible for the federal administration of Canada. A constitutional monarchy, the Crown assumes distinct roles: the executive, as the Crown-in-Council; the legislative, as the Crown-in-Parliament; and the judicial, as the Crown-on-the-Bench. Three institutions—the Privy Council (conventionally, the Cabinet), the Parliament, and the judiciary, respectively—exercise the powers of the Crown.

The term Government of Canada commonly refers specifically to the executive, which includes ministers of the Crown (together in the Cabinet) and the federal civil service (whom the Cabinet direct); what is formally known as His Majesty's Government and is corporately branded as the Government of Canada. There are over 100 ministries, departments, and crown corporations and over 300,000 persons employed in the Government of Canada. These institutions carry out the programs and enforce the laws established by the Parliament of Canada.

The federal government's organization and structure was established at Confederation, through the Constitution Act, 1867, wherein the Canadian Crown acts as the core, or "the most basic building block", of its Westminster-style parliamentary democracy. The monarch, is personally represented by a governor general (currently Mary Simon) and is head of state. A prime minister (currently Justin Trudeau) is the head of government, who is invited by the Crown to form a government after securing the confidence of the House of Commons, which is typically determined through the election of enough members of a single political party in a federal election to provide a majority of seats in Parliament, forming a governing party. Further elements of governance are outlined in the rest of the Canadian constitution, which includes written statutes in addition to court rulings and unwritten conventions developed over centuries.

Constitutionally, the King's Privy Council for Canada is the body that advises the sovereign or their representative on the exercise of executive power. This task is nearly exclusively by the Cabinet, a committe within the Privy Council that sets the government's policies and priorities for the country and is chaired by the prime minister. The sovereign appoints the members of Cabinet on the advice of the prime minister who, by convention, are selected from the House of Commons or, less often, the Senate. During its term, the government must retain the confidence of the House of Commons and certain important motions, such as money bills and the speech from the throne, are considered as confidence motions. Laws are formed by the passage of bills through Parliament, which are either sponsored by the government or individual members of Parliament. Once a bill has been approved by both the House of Commons and the Senate, royal assent is required to make the bill become law. The laws are then the responsibility of the government to oversee and enforce.

Terminology
In Canadian English, the term government is used to refer both to the whole set of institutions (executive, legislative, and judicial powers) that govern the country (just as in American English; whereas, in British English, the term used is state) and to the executive branch (just as in British English; whereas, the term in American English would be administration). When the word is capitalized, as in Government of Canada, it always refers to the executive branch.

In press releases issued by federal departments, the government has sometimes been referred to as the current prime minister's government (e.g. the Trudeau Government). This terminology has been commonly employed in the media. In late 2010, an informal instruction from the Office of the Prime Minister urged government departments to consistently use, in all department communications, such phrasing (i.e., Harper Government, at the time), in place of Government of Canada. The same Cabinet earlier directed its press department to use the phrase Canada's New Government.

Crown

Monarch 

Canada is a constitutional monarchy, wherein the role of the reigning sovereign is both legal and practical, but not political. The monarch is vested with all powers of state and sits at the centre of a construct in which the power of the whole is shared by multiple institutions of government acting under the sovereign's authority. The executive is thus formally referred to as the King-in-Council, the legislature as the King-in-Parliament, and the courts as the King-on-the-Bench.

Though the person who is monarch of Canada (currently ) is also the monarch of 14 other countries in the Commonwealth of Nations, he nevertheless reigns separately as King of Canada, an office that is "truly Canadian" and "totally independent from that of the monarch of the United Kingdom or the other Commonwealth realms." On the advice of the Canadian prime minister, the sovereign appoints a federal viceregal representative—the governor general (currently Mary Simon)—who, since 1947, is permitted to exercise almost all of the monarch's royal prerogative; though, there are some duties which must be specifically performed by the monarch themselves (such as assent of certain bills). In case of the governor general's absence or incapacitation, the administrator of Canada performs the Crown's most basic functions.

Royal assent is required to enact laws. As part of the royal prerogative, the royal sign-manual gives authority to letters patent and orders-in-Council. Much of the royal prerogative is only exercised in-council, on the advice of the Cabinet; within the conventional stipulations of a constitutional monarchy, the sovereign's direct participation in any of these areas of governance is limited. The royal prerogative also includes summoning, proroguing, and dissolving Parliament in order to call an election and extends to foreign affairs, which include the negotiation and ratification of treaties, alliances, international agreements, and declarations of war; the accreditation of Canadian diplomats and receipt of foreign diplomats; and the issuance of passports.

Executive power

The executive power is vested in the Crown and exercised "in-Council", meaning on the advice of the Privy Council; conventionally, this is the Cabinet, which is chaired by the prime minister and comprises ministers of the Crown. The term Government of Canada, or more formally,  Majesty's Government refers to the activities of the -in-Council. The day-to-day operation and activities of the Government of Canada are performed by the federal departments and agencies, staffed by the Public Service of Canada, and the Canadian Armed Forces.

Prime minister 

One of the main duties of the Crown is to ensure that a democratic government is always in place, which includes the appointment of a prime minister, who heads the Cabinet and directs the activities of the government. Not outlined in any constitutional document, the office exists in long-established convention, which stipulates the Crown must select as prime minister the person most likely to command the confidence of the elected House of Commons, who, in practice, is typically the leader of the political party that holds more seats than any other party in that chamber (currently the Liberal Party, led by Justin Trudeau). Should no particular party hold a majority in the House of Commons, the leader of one party—either the party with the most seats or one supported by other parties—will be called by the governor general to form a minority government. Once sworn in, the prime minister holds office until their resignation or removal by the governor general, after either a motion of no confidence or defeat in a general election.

Privy Council 

The executive is defined in the Constitution Act, 1867 as the Crown acting on the advice of the Privy Council for Canada, referred to as the -in-Council. However, the Privy Council—consisting mostly of former ministers, chief justices, and other elder statesmen—rarely meets in full. In the construct of constitutional monarchy and responsible government, the advice tendered is typically binding, meaning the monarch reigns but does not rule, with the Cabinet ruling "in trust" for the monarch. However, the royal prerogative belongs to the Crown and not to any of the ministers.

Cabinet 

The stipulations of responsible government require that those who directly advise the Crown on the exercise the royal prerogative be accountable to the elected House of Commons and the day-to-day operation of government is guided only by a sub-group of the Privy Council made up of individuals who hold seats in Parliament, known as the Cabinet.

The monarch and governor general typically follow the near-binding advice of their ministers. The royal prerogative, however, belongs to the Crown and not to any of the ministers, who only rule "in trust" for the monarch and who must relinquish the Crown's power back to it upon losing the confidence of the commons, whereupon a new government, which can hold the lower chamber's confidence, is installed by the governor general. The royal and vice-royal figures may unilaterally use these powers in exceptional constitutional crisis situations (an exercise of the reserve powers), thereby allowing the monarch to make sure "that the government conducts itself in compliance with the constitution." Politicians can sometimes try to use to their favour the complexity of the relationship between the monarch, viceroy, ministers, and Parliament, as well as the public's general unfamiliarity with such.

Legislative power

The Parliament of Canada, defined section 17 of the Constitution Act, 1867 is the federal legislature. It is bicameral in nature and comprises two chambers—the elected House of Commons (lower house), and the Senate of Canada (upper house), whose membership is nominated by prime ministers—and the -in-Parliament, who grants royal assent to bills passed by both chambers.

A parliamentary session lasts until a prorogation, after which, without ceremony, both chambers of the legislature cease all legislative business until the governor general issues another royal proclamation calling for a new session to begin. A session begins with a speech from the throne, whereby the governor general or the monarch delivers the governing party's prepared speech of their intentions for the session. After a number of such sessions, each parliament comes to an end via dissolution. Since a general election will typically follow, the timing of a dissolution is usually politically motivated, with the prime minister selecting a moment most advantageous to his or her political party. However, the end of session may also be necessary if the majority of the House of Commons revoke their confidence in the prime minister's ability to govern, such as through a vote of no-confidence or if the government's budget is voted down (a loss of supply). While the Canada Elections Act mandates that members of Parliament stand for election a minimum of every four-years, no session has ever been allowed to expire in such a fashion.

Role of the Crown 
The Crown does not participate in the legislative process save for signifying approval to a bill passed by both chambers of Parliament, known as the granting of royal assent, which is necessary for a bill to be enacted as law. All federal bills thus begin with the phrase:

Members of the two chambers of Parliament must also express their loyalty to the Crown and thus to Canada by reciting the Oath of Allegiance, which must be sworn by all new parliamentarians before they may take their seats. Further, the Official Opposition is formally termed  Majesty's Loyal Opposition, to signify that, though they may be opposed to the incumbent Cabinet's policies, they remain dedicated to the apolitical Crown.

House of Commons 
As a democratic tradition, the elected House of Commons, while the lower house, is the dominant branch of Parliament and, as such, the Senate and Crown rarely oppose its will. Any spending bill must originate in the House of Commons and the prime minister holds office by virtue of commanding its confidence. The 338 members of the House of Commons, known as members of Parliament (MPs) are directly elected by Canadian citizens, with each member representing a single electoral district for a period mandated by the Canada Elections Act of no more than four years (though the Charter of Rights and Freedoms mandates a maximum of five years).

Members of the governing party sit on the government benches, located on the speaker's right and members of the opposition parties on the left, with the Cabinet of Canada and prime minister, and shadow cabinet and leader of the Opposition across from one another (known as frontbenchers).

Senate 
The upper house of the Parliament of Canada, the Senate, is a group of 105 individuals appointed by the Crown on the advice of the prime minister. Appointees must be a minimum of 30 years old, be a subject of the monarch, and own property with a net worth of at least $4,000, in addition to owning land worth no less than $4,000 within the province they represent. Senators serve until a mandatory retirement age of 75.

The principle underlying the Senate's composition is equality amongst Canada's geographic regions: 24 for Ontario, 24 for Quebec, 24 for the Maritimes (10 for Nova Scotia, 10 for New Brunswick, and four for Prince Edward Island), and 24 for the Western provinces (six each for Manitoba, British Columbia, Saskatchewan, and Alberta). Additionally, senators are appointed from two geographic areas not part of any senatorial division. Newfoundland and Labrador (since 1949 the "newest" province, although "oldest" English settlement), is represented by six senators. Since 1975 each of Canada's territories is represented by 1 senator—the Northwest Territories, Yukon, and (since its formation in 1999) Nunavut.

Judicial

The Crown is responsible for rendering justice and is thus traditionally deemed the fount of justice. However, the monarch does not personally rule in judicial cases; instead the judicial functions of the royal prerogative are performed in trust and in the Crown's name by officers of the judicial system.

The Supreme Court of Canada—the country's court of last resort—has nine justices appointed by the governor general on recommendation by the prime minister and led by the chief justice of Canada, and hears appeals from decisions rendered by the various appellate courts (provincial, territorial, and federal).

The Federal Court hears cases arising under certain areas of federal law, and works in conjunction with the Tax Court of Canada.

Federalism

The powers of the parliaments in Canada are limited by the Constitution, which divides legislative abilities between the federal and provincial governments. In general, the provincial legislatures may only pass laws relating to topics explicitly reserved for them by the constitution, such as education, provincial officers, municipal government, charitable institutions, and "matters of a merely local or private nature," whereas any matter not under the exclusive authority of the provincial legislatures is within the scope of the federal parliament's power.

Thus, the federal Parliament alone can pass laws relating to, amongst other things, Canada's postal service, census, military, criminal law, navigation and shipping, fishing, currency, banking, weights and measures, bankruptcy, copyrights, patents, First Nations, and naturalization.

In some cases, federal and provincial jurisdictions may be more vague. For instance, the federal parliament regulates marriage and divorce in general, while the solemnization of marriage is regulated only by provincial legislatures. Other examples include the powers of both the federal and provincial parliaments to impose taxes, borrow money, punish crimes, and regulate agriculture.

Political culture 

An emphasis on liberalism and social justice has been a distinguishing element of Canada's political culture. Individual rights, equality, and inclusiveness (i.e. a just society) have risen to the forefront of political and legal importance for most Canadians, as demonstrated through: support for the Canadian Charter of Rights and Freedoms; a relatively free economy; and social liberal attitudes toward women's rights, homosexuality, abortion rights, euthanasia, cannabis use, and other egalitarian movements. Likewise, there is a sense of collective responsibility in Canadian political culture, as is demonstrated in general support for universal health care, multiculturalism, foreign aid, and other social programs. Peace, order, and good government, alongside an implied bill of rights are founding principles of the Canadian government.

At the federal level, Canada has been dominated by two relatively centrist parties practising "brokerage politics:" the centre-left leaning Liberal Party of Canada and the centre-right leaning Conservative Party of Canada (or its predecessors). In the Canadian political spectrum, the historically predominant Liberals have positioned themselves more-or-less at the centre, with Conservatives sitting to their right and New Democrats occupying the further left. Smaller parties, such as the Green Party of Canada and the Quebec-nationalist Bloc Québécois, have also been able to exert their influence over the political process by representation at the federal level. Far-right and far-left politics, in terms of Canadian politics, have never been a prominent force in Canadian society.

Polls have suggested that Canadians generally do not have a solid understanding of civics. This has been theorized to be a result of less attention being given to the subject in provincial education curricula, beginning in the 1960s. By 2008, a poll showed only 24 per cent of respondents could name the monarch as head of state. Likewise, Senator Lowell Murray wrote five years earlier that "the Crown has become irrelevant to most Canadians' understanding of our system of Government." As John Robson of the National Post opined in 2015: "Intellectually, voters and commentators succumb to the mistaken notion that we elect 'governments' of prime ministers and cabinets with untrammelled authority, that indeed ideal 'democracy' consists precisely in this kind of plebiscitary autocracy."

See also

 Structure of the Canadian federal government
  Majesty's Government (term)
 Canadian order of precedence
 Office-holders of Canada
 Public Service of Canada
 .gc.ca

References

Notes

Citations

Further reading

External links 
 
 Public Accounts of Canada, from 1995, in pdf
 Wayback Times: Archives of the Government of Canada website
 Federal Government

 
1867 establishments in Canada
Politics of Canada
Canada